The American Chess Congress was a series of chess tournaments held in the United States, a predecessor to the current U.S. Chess Championship. It had nine editions, the first played in October 1857 and the last in August 1923.

First American Chess Congress (1857)

The first American Chess Congress, organized by Daniel Willard Fiske and held in New York, October 6 to November 10, 1857, was won by Paul Morphy. It was a knockout tournament in which draws did not count. The top sixteen American players were invited (William Allison, Samuel Robert Calthrop, Daniel Willard Fiske, William James Fuller, Hiram Kennicott, Hubert Knott, Theodor Lichtenhein, Napoleon Marache, Hardman Philips Montgomery, Alexander Beaufort Meek, Paul Morphy, Louis Paulsen, Frederick Perrin, Benjamin Raphael, Charles Henry Stanley, and James Thompson). First prize was $300.  Morphy refused any money, but accepted a silver service consisting of a pitcher, four goblets, and a tray. Morphy's prize was given to him by Oliver Wendell Holmes, Sr.

Shown on the right is lithograph of the First American Chess Congress 1857. All members of the Congress are shown, including those who did not play in the main tournament. Top row: Colonel Charles Mead (chairman), George Hammond, Frederic Perrin, Daniel Willard Fiske, Hiram Kennicott, and Hardman Philips Montgomery. Left column: Hubert Knott, Louis Paulsen, and William Allison. Bottom row: Theodore Lichtenhein, James Thompson, Charles Henry Stanley, Alexander Beaufort Meek, Samuel Robert Calthrop, and Napoleon Marache. Right column: William James Fuller, Paul Morphy, and Benjamin Raphael.

Second American Chess Congress (1871)
The second American Chess Congress was held in Cleveland on December 4–15, 1871 and won by George Henry Mackenzie. The first prize was $100 (~$1,500 today) and the total prize fund was $290 (~$5,000 today). The entry fee was $10 ($150 today). It was a double round robin tournament with a time limit of 12 moves an hour.  Draw games were replayed. There were nine players (George Henry Mackenzie, Henry Hosmer, Frederick Elder, Max Judd, Preston Ware, Harsen Darwin Smith, Henry Harding, A. Johnston, and William Houghton). With the retirement of Morphy, this tournament was generally intended to recognize the best player in the United States.

{|class="wikitable" style="margin: 1em auto 1em auto; "
|  style="background:#f0f0f0;"| 
|  style="background:#f0f0f0;"|Player
|  style="background:#f0f0f0;"|1
|  style="background:#f0f0f0;"|2
| style="background:#f0f0f0;"|3
| style="background:#f0f0f0;"|4
|  style="background:#f0f0f0;"|5
|  style="background:#f0f0f0;"|6
|  style="background:#f0f0f0;"|7
|  style="background:#f0f0f0;"|8
|  style="background:#f0f0f0;"|9
|  style="background:#f0f0f0;"|Total wins
|-
| 1||||xxxx||1½0||½10||11||11||11||1½1||11||11||14
|-
| 2||||0½1||xxxx||11||1½1||00||01||11||11||11||12
|-
| 3||||½01||00||xxxx||01||½½01||11||11||11||11||11
|-
| 4||||00||0½0||10||xxxx||11||10||½11||½11||11||10
|-
| 5||||00||11||½½10||00||xxxx||01||10||11||11||9
|-
| 6||||00||10||00||01||10||xxxx||11||11||11||9
|-
| 7||||0½0||00||00||½00||01||00||xxxx||01||11||4
|-
| 8||||00||00||00||½00||00||00||10||xxxx||11||3
|-
| 9||||00||00||00||00||00||00||00||00||xxxx||0
|-
|}

Third American Chess Congress (1874)
The third American Chess Congress was held in Chicago on July 7–16, 1874 and won by Mackenzie. There were eight players (Mackenzie, Hosmer, Judd, Bock, Elder, Perrin, Congdon, and Kennicott) and they had to pay a $20 entry fee. first place prize was $225. The tournament was again round robin, but for the first time draws were not replayed. The time control was 15 moves per hour. Elder and Kennicott withdraw before completing half their games, but their scores still counted.

{|class="wikitable" style="margin: 1em auto 1em auto; "
|  style="background:#f0f0f0;"|#
|  style="background:#f0f0f0;"|Player
|  style="background:#f0f0f0;"|1
|  style="background:#f0f0f0;"|2
|  style="background:#f0f0f0;"|3
|  style="background:#f0f0f0;"|4
|  style="background:#f0f0f0;"|5
|  style="background:#f0f0f0;"|6
|  style="background:#f0f0f0;"|7
|  style="background:#f0f0f0;"|8
|  style="background:#f0f0f0;"|Total wins
|-
| 1||||xx||10||1½||11||--||11||11||11||10½
|-
| 2||||01||xx||10||11||--||11||11||11||10
|-
| 3||||0½||01||xx||1½||--||11||11||--||7
|-
| 4|| ||00||00||0½||xx||1½||11||1½||--||5½
|-
| 5||||--||--||--||0½||xx||01||11||--||3½
|-
| 6||||00||00||00||00||10||xx||10||--||2
|-
| 7||||00||00||00||0½||00||01||xx||--||1½
|-
| 8||||00||00||--||--||--||--||--||xx||0
|}

Fourth American Chess Congress (1876)
The fourth American Chess Congress (called the American Centennial Championship) was held in Philadelphia on August 17–31, 1876 and won by James Mason. There were nine players (Mason, Judd, Davidson, Henry Bird, Elson, Roberts, Ware, Barbour, and Martinez). The entry fee was $20. First place was $300. Never intended to recognize the best player in America, this tournament was geared towards attracting foreign masters, and to awarding the Governor Garland Silver Cup, as well as celebrating the American Centennial.

{|class="wikitable" style="margin: 1em auto 1em auto; "
|  style="background:#f0f0f0;"| 
|  style="background:#f0f0f0;"|Player
|  style="background:#f0f0f0;"|1
|  style="background:#f0f0f0;"|2
| style="background:#f0f0f0;"|3
| style="background:#f0f0f0;"|4
|  style="background:#f0f0f0;"|5
|  style="background:#f0f0f0;"|6
|  style="background:#f0f0f0;"|7
|  style="background:#f0f0f0;"|8
|  style="background:#f0f0f0;"|9
|  style="background:#f0f0f0;"|Total
|-
| 1||||xx||1½||10||1½||½1||1½||11||½1||--||10½
|-
| 2||||0½||xx||00||10||1½||11||11||11||--||9
|-
| 3||||01||11||xx||½0||0½||½1||01||11||--||8½
|-
| 4||||0½||01||½1||xx||0½||11||½1||½1||--||8½
|-
| 5||||½0||0½||1½||1½||xx||½½||10||11||--||8
|-
| 6||||0½||00||½0||00||½½||xx||1½||11||--||5½
|-
| 7||||00||00||10||½0||01||0½||xx||½½||--||4
|-
| 8||||½0||00||00||½0||00||00||½½||xx||--||2
|-
| 9||||00||--||½½||--||--||--||--||--||xx||1
|-
|}

Fifth American Chess Congress (1880)
The fifth American Chess Congress was held in New York on January 6–26, 1880 and won by Mackenzie (he beat James Grundy on tiebreak, 2–0). There were 10 players: Cohnfeld, Congdon, Eugene Delmar, Grundy, Judd, Mackenzie, Mohle, Ryan, Sellman, and Ware.

{|class="wikitable" style="margin: 1em auto 1em auto; "
|  style="background:#f0f0f0;"| 
|  style="background:#f0f0f0;"|Player
|  style="background:#f0f0f0;"|1
|  style="background:#f0f0f0;"|2
| style="background:#f0f0f0;"|3
| style="background:#f0f0f0;"|4
|  style="background:#f0f0f0;"|5
|  style="background:#f0f0f0;"|6
|  style="background:#f0f0f0;"|7
|  style="background:#f0f0f0;"|8
|  style="background:#f0f0f0;"|9
|  style="background:#f0f0f0;"|10
|  style="background:#f0f0f0;"|Total
|-
| 1||||xx||0½||10||½½||½1||11||11||11||1½||11||13½
|-
| 2||||1½||xx||½½||10||1½||11||1½||01||11||11||13½
|-
| 3||||01||½½||xx||0½||1½||10||11||11||11||11||13
|-
| 4||||½½||01||1½||xx||10||1½||11||0½||11||11||12½
|-
| 5||||½0||0½||0½||01||xx||½1||11||11||01||11||11
|-
| 6||||00||00||01||0½||½0||xx||11||11||½1||11||9½
|-
| 7||||00||0½||00||00||00||00||xx||11||01||11||5½
|-
| 8||||00||10||00||1½||00||00||00||xx||½1||1½||5½
|-
| 9||||½0||00||00||00||10||½0||01||0½||xx||00 ||3½
|-
| 10||||00||00||00||00||00||00||00||0½||11||xx||2½
|-
|}

Sixth American Chess Congress (1889) 
The sixth American Chess Congress was held in New York in 1889 (a 20-man double round-robin tournament; one of the longest tournaments in history). The event was won by Mikhail Chigorin and Max Weiss. Both finished with a score of 29 but Chigorin defeated Weiss in their individual game. The top American finisher was S. Lipschütz, who took sixth place (his supporters in the Eastern US tried to push his claim to being US Champion as a result of this tournament; however, Lipschütz's claim was not accepted by all).  Under rules that reigning World Champion Wilhelm Steinitz helped to develop, the winner was to be regarded as World Champion for the time being, but must be prepared to face a challenge from the second- or third-placed competitor within a month. Mikhail Chigorin and Max Weiss tied for first, and remained tied after drawing all four games of a playoff. Weiss was not interested in playing a championship match, but Isidor Gunsberg, the third-place finisher, exercised his right and challenged Chigorin to a World Championship match. In 1890, he drew a first-to-10-wins match against Chigorin (9-9 with five draws). These were the same terms (9-9 draw clause) as the first World Championship match between Steinitz and Zukertort in 1886. They were also the same match terms that Bobby Fischer would insist on for his title defense in 1975.

{|class="wikitable" style="margin: 1em auto 1em auto; "
|  style="background:#f0f0f0;"| 
|  style="background:#f0f0f0;"|Player
|  style="background:#f0f0f0;"|1
|  style="background:#f0f0f0;"|2
| style="background:#f0f0f0;"|3
| style="background:#f0f0f0;"|4
|  style="background:#f0f0f0;"|5
|  style="background:#f0f0f0;"|6
|  style="background:#f0f0f0;"|7
|  style="background:#f0f0f0;"|8
|  style="background:#f0f0f0;"|9
|  style="background:#f0f0f0;"|10
|  style="background:#f0f0f0;"|11
|  style="background:#f0f0f0;"|12
| style="background:#f0f0f0;"|13
| style="background:#f0f0f0;"|14
|  style="background:#f0f0f0;"|15
|  style="background:#f0f0f0;"|16
|  style="background:#f0f0f0;"|17
|  style="background:#f0f0f0;"|18
|  style="background:#f0f0f0;"|19
|  style="background:#f0f0f0;"|20
|  style="background:#f0f0f0;"|Total
|-
| 1||||xx||½1||00||½1||11||10||00||11||01||½1||11||11||½1||11||10||11||11||11||11||11||29
|-
| 2||||½0||xx||½1||10||½½||½1||1½||11||11||11||10||½½||½1||10||11||11||½1||11||11||11||29
|-
| 3||||11||½0||xx||01||½0||½0||1½||10||11||11||½1||11||01||11||01||11||11||11||11||11||28½
|-
| 4||||½0||01||10||xx||01||10||10||01||11||10||11||11||11||11||11||10||11||½1||11||10||27
|-
| 5||||00||½½||½1||10||xx||1½||00||11||11||10||11||11||01||00||11||01||11||11||11||11||26
|-
| 6||||01||½0||½1||01||0½||xx||½1||00||11||½1||10||½0||½1||11||11||11||10||11||11||11||25½
|-
| 7||||11||0½||0½||01||11||½0||xx||½0||00||11||½0||10||01||01||½1||1½||½1||½½||11||11||22
|-
| 8||||00||00||01||10||00||11||½1||xx||10||11||01||00||11||00||½1||½0||10||½1||11||11||20
|-
| 9||||10||00||00||00||00||00||11||01||xx||½0||10||11||0½||10||01||11||10||11||11||01||18
|-
| 10||||½0||00||00||01||01||½0||00||00||½1||xx||½1||10||10||10||11||½0||01||½1||11||11||18
|-
| 11||||00||01||½0||00||00||01||½1||10||01||½0||xx||01||½1||½1||01||11||00||00||11||11||17½
|-
| 12||||00||½½||00||00||00||½1||01||11||00||01||10||xx||½0||11||½1||11||00||10||½0||11||17
|-
| 13||||½0||½0||10||00||10||½0||10||00||1½||01||½0||½1||xx||01||00||0½||½1||10||11||11||17
|-
| 14||||00||01||00||00||11||00||10||11||01||01||½0||00||10||xx||10||00||01||11||10||½1||16
|-
| 15||||01||00||10||00||00||00||½0||½0||10||00||10||½0||11||01||xx||½1||1½||00||½1||11||15
|-
| 16||||00||00||00||01||10||00||0½||½1||00||½1||00||00||1½||11||½0||xx||10||01||0½||11||14
|-
| 17||||00||½0||00||00||00||01||½0||01||01||10||11||11||½0||10||0½||01||xx||00||1½||00||13½
|-
| 18||||00||00||00||½0||00||00||½½||½0||00||½0||11||01||01||00||11||10||11||xx||01||01||13½
|-
| 19||||00||00||00||00||00||00||00||00||00||00||00||½1||00||01||½0||1½||0½||10||xx||10||7
|-
| 20||||00||00||00||01||00||00||00||00||10||00||00||00||00||½0||00||00||11||10||01||xx||6½
|}

Seventh American Chess Congress (1904)

The seventh American Chess Congress was held in St. Louis in 1904. With US Champion Harry Nelson Pillsbury ill and dying, Max Judd tried to arrange the seventh ACC, with the stipulation that the US title be awarded to the winner. Judd disputed Pillsbury's ownership of the title by challenging the legitimacy of the whole succession since the time of Mackenzie, disputing Lipschutz's claim to have acquired the title at New York 1889, and everything that had happened since then. Pillsbury, from bed objected to Judd's plans, and prevailed on his friend, the lawyer Walter Penn Shipley, to intercede. Judd's tournament was held anyway, and said to be for "The United States Tourney Championship", a title explicitly said to have no relation to the United States Championship title held by Pillsbury. The tournament was won by Frank James Marshall, ahead of Judd. There were 10 players: Louis Eisenberg, Charles Jaffe, Judd, Kemeny, Marshall, Stasch Mlotkowski, Edward F. Schrader, Eugene Wesley Schrader, Schwietzer, and Louis Uedemann. The winner was actually named U.S. Champion at the conclusion of this tournament.

{|class="wikitable" style="margin: 1em auto 1em auto; "
|  style="background:#f0f0f0;"| 
|  style="background:#f0f0f0;"|Player
|  style="background:#f0f0f0;"|1
|  style="background:#f0f0f0;"|2
| style="background:#f0f0f0;"|3
| style="background:#f0f0f0;"|4
|  style="background:#f0f0f0;"|5
|  style="background:#f0f0f0;"|6
|  style="background:#f0f0f0;"|7
|  style="background:#f0f0f0;"|8
|  style="background:#f0f0f0;"|9
|  style="background:#f0f0f0;"|0
|  style="background:#f0f0f0;"|Total
|-
| 1|| || x || 1 || 1 || 1 || 1 || 1 || 1 || 1 || ½ || 1 || 8½
|-
| 2|| || 0 || x || 0 || 1 || 1 || 1 || 1 || 1 || 1 || 1 || 7
|-
| 3|| || 0 || 1 || x || 1 || 1 || 1 || 0 || 0 || 1 || 1 || 6
|-
| 4|| || 0 || 0 || 0 || x || 1 || 1 || 1 || 0 || 1 || 1 || 5
|-
| 5|| || 0 || 0 || 0 || 0 || x || ½ || 1 || 1 || 1 || 1 || 4½
|-
| 6|| || 0 || 0 || 0 || 0 || ½ || x || 1 || 1 || 1 || 1 || 4½
|-
| 7|| || 0 || 0 || 1 || 0 || 0 || 0 || x || 1 || 1 || 1 || 4
|-
| 8|| || 0 || 0 || 1 || 1 || 0 || 0 || 0 || x || 0 || 1 || 3
|-
| 9|| || ½ || 0 || 0 || 0 || 0 || 0 || 0 || 1 || x || 1 || 2½
|-
| 10|| || 0 || 0 || 0 || 0 || 0 || 0 || 0 || 0 || 0 || x || 0
|-
|}

Eighth American Chess Congress (1921)
The eighth American Chess Congress was held in Atlantic City in 1921. The event was won by Dawid Janowski, followed by Norman Whitaker, Jaffe, etc. There were 12 players: Samuel Factor, Hago, Harvey, Jackson, Jaffe, Janowski, Marshall, Mlotkowski, Sharp, Vladimir Sournin, Isador Turover, and Whitaker.

{|class="wikitable" style="margin: 1em auto 1em auto; "
|  style="background:#f0f0f0;"| 
|  style="background:#f0f0f0;"|Player
|  style="background:#f0f0f0;"|1
|  style="background:#f0f0f0;"|2
| style="background:#f0f0f0;"|3
| style="background:#f0f0f0;"|4
|  style="background:#f0f0f0;"|5
|  style="background:#f0f0f0;"|6
|  style="background:#f0f0f0;"|7
|  style="background:#f0f0f0;"|8
|  style="background:#f0f0f0;"|9
|  style="background:#f0f0f0;"|0
|  style="background:#f0f0f0;"|1
|  style="background:#f0f0f0;"|2
|  style="background:#f0f0f0;"|Total
|-
| 1||||x||0||1||½||½||1||½||1 ||1 || 1||1 ||1 ||8½
|-
| 2||||1||x||0||1||1||1||0||1|| 0||1|| 1||1||8
|-
| 3||||0||1||x||1||1||0||0||1  ||1 ||0 ||1 ||1 ||7
|-
| 4||||½ ||0 ||0 ||x||½ ||½ ||1 ||½ ||1 ||½ ||1 ||1 ||6½
|-
| 5|| || ½  || 0 ||0 ||½  ||x||½  ||0||1 ||½  ||1 ||1|| ||6
|-
| 6||||0 ||0||1 ||½ ||½ ||x||1 ||0 ||½ ||½ ||1 ||1 ||6
|-
| 7||||½ ||1||1 ||0 ||1 ||0 ||x||0 ||½ ||½ ||1 ||½ ||6
|-
| 8||||0||0 ||0||½ ||0 ||1 ||1 ||x||½||½ ||1 || 1||5½
|-
| 9||||0 || 1||0 ||0 ||½ ||½ ||½ ||½||x||1||1 ||½ ||5½
|-
| 10|||| 0||0||1||½ || 0||½ ||½ ||½ ||0 ||x||1 ||1 ||5
|-
| 11||||0 ||0 || 0||0 ||0||0 ||0 ||0 ||0 ||0 ||x||1||1
|-
| 12||||0 ||0 ||0 || 0||0 ||0||½ ||0 ||½ ||0 || 0|| x||1
|-
|}

Ninth American Chess Congress (1923)
The ninth and last American Chess Congress was held in Hotel Alamac in Lake Hopatcong, New Jersey on August 6–21, 1923. The tournament was played between 14 players: Horace Bigelow, Roy Turnbull Black, Oscar Chajes, Albert Hodges, Dawid Janowski, Abraham Kupchik, Edward Lasker, Frank James Marshall, John Stuart Morrison, Marvin Palmer, Anthony Santasiere, Morris Schapiro, Vladimir Sournin, and Oscar Tenner. It ended with a tie between Marshall and Kupchik scoring 10½ out of 13.

{|class="wikitable" style="margin: 1em auto 1em auto; "
|  style="background:#f0f0f0;"| 
|  style="background:#f0f0f0;"|Player
|  style="background:#f0f0f0;"|1
|  style="background:#f0f0f0;"|2
| style="background:#f0f0f0;"|3
| style="background:#f0f0f0;"|4
|  style="background:#f0f0f0;"|5
|  style="background:#f0f0f0;"|6
|  style="background:#f0f0f0;"|7
|  style="background:#f0f0f0;"|8
|  style="background:#f0f0f0;"|9
|  style="background:#f0f0f0;"|0
|  style="background:#f0f0f0;"|1
|  style="background:#f0f0f0;"|2
|  style="background:#f0f0f0;"|3
|  style="background:#f0f0f0;"|4
|  style="background:#f0f0f0;"|Total
|-
| 1||||x||1||½ ||1 ||½ ||1 ||1 ||1 ||1 ||½ ||½ ||1 ||½ ||1 ||10½
|-
| 2||||0||x||1 ||0 ||1 ||½||1||1 || 1||1 || 1||1 ||1 ||1 ||10½
|-
| 3||||½ ||0 ||x||1 ||½ ||½ ||1 ||1  ||1 ||1 ||1 ||1 ||½ ||1 ||10
|-
| 4||||0 ||1 ||0 ||x||½ ||1 ||1 ||1 ||0 ||1 ||1 ||1 ||½ ||1 ||9
|-
| 5||||½ ||0 ||½ ||½ ||x||1 ||0||½ ||1 ||½ ||1||1 ||1 ||1 ||8½
|-
| 6||||0 ||½ ||½ ||0 ||0 ||x||1 ||0 ||1 ||0 ||1 ||1 ||1 ||1 ||7
|-
| 7||||0 ||0 ||0 ||0 ||1 ||0 ||x||1 ||½ ||1 ||1 ||0 ||1 ||1 ||6½
|-
| 8||||0 ||0 ||0 ||0 ||½ ||1 ||0 ||x||1 ||1 ||0 ||1 ||1 ||1 ||6½
|-
| 9||||0 ||0 ||0 ||1 ||0 ||0 ||½ ||0 ||x||1 ||1 ||1 ||½ ||½ ||5½
|-
| 10||||½ ||0 ||0 ||0 ||½ ||1 ||0 ||0 ||0 ||x||½ ||½ ||1 ||1 ||5
|-
| 11||||½ ||0 ||0 ||0 ||0 ||0 ||0 ||1 ||0 ||½ ||x||½ ||1 ||½ ||4
|-
| 12||||0 ||0 ||0 ||0 ||0 ||0 ||1 ||0 ||0 ||½ ||½ || x||1 ||0 ||3
|-
| 13||||½ ||0 ||½ ||½ ||0||0 ||0 ||0 ||½ ||0 ||0 ||0 ||x ||½ ||2½
|-
| 14||||0 ||0 ||0 ||0 ||0 ||0 ||0 ||0 ||½ ||0 ||½ ||1 ||½ ||x ||2½
|-
|}

See also
U.S. Chess Championship
U.S. Women's Chess Championship
U.S. Open Chess Championship
U.S. Women's Open Chess Championship

References

Further reading
Fiske, Daniel Willard (1859), [ The Book of the First American Chess Congress], Rudd & Carleton, New York
This book was reprinted as 
Brownson, O. A. Jr (1872), [ The Book of the Second American Chess Congress Held at Cleveland, Ohio], Dubuque, Iowa
Office of the American Chess Journal (1876) The Third American Chess Congress Held at Chicago, Ill., 1874, Hannibal, Missouri.
Sayen, Henry W. (1876), The Grand International Centennial Chess Congress, held in Philadelphia in August, 1876, Philadelphia
These three books were reprinted in one volume as 
 Gilberg, Charles A (1881), [ The Fifth American Chess Congress], New York
This book was reprinted as 
Steinitz, William (1891), [ The Book of the Sixth American Chess Congress], New York
This book was reprinted as: 
It was recently reprinted as: 

Chess competitions
Chess in the United States
1857 in chess
1923 in chess
1857 establishments in New York (state)
1923 disestablishments in the United States
Recurring sporting events established in 1857
Recurring sporting events disestablished in 1923